is a feature-length Doraemon film which premiered in Japan on 11 March 1989, based on the ninth volume of the same name of the Doraemon Long Stories series. This was the first Heisei-era Doraemon movie. It's the 10th Doraemon film. In 2016, the movie was remade, with the title of Doraemon: Nobita and the Birth of Japan 2016.

Plot 
The movie starts with a boy who belongs to prehistoric time hunting a fish, gets captured in a time vortex and reaches to the 20th century. In the 20th century, Nobita wants to run away from his home. As a result of failing to find an ideal home, Nobita decides to make a makeshift place to live. However, he still cannot find a place to live due to land property ownership laws. At the same time, Shizuka, Gian, Suneo and Doraemon want to run away from their homes. Nobita suggests that they should go back in time to live in a place with no human. The group agree with him and thus, they go to prehistoric Japan, 70,000 years in the past.

When they reach Japan, Doraemon assigns everyone a ministry. Shizuka is given the ministry of gardening, Gian gets the ministry of development, Suneo receives the ministry of landscape and Nobita receives the ministry of animals, with Doraemon overseeing all ministries. Nobita mixes the genes of different animal and creates a dragon, griffin and pegasus. When Doraemon comes, he hides them from him.

At night, the group eat the supper and decide to return home and visit there another day. On the next day, the boy from the start of the movie secretly moves into Nobita's room and hides inside the closet. When Gian and Suneo come, the boy attacks Gian and Gian fights with him. Due to weakness, the boy faints. On the arrival of Nobita, Shizuka and Doraemon, the group again moves to the past. They take the boy into their cave and when he regains consciousness, Shizuka gives him food. Meanwhile, Doraemon searches with a signal through time and learns that the boy hails from somewhere in present-day Nanjing, China, which has been already inhabited by humans since more than 70,000 years ago. Doraemon further uses a translation tool in order to understand him. He tells them that he belongs to the light tribe and his tribe got attacked by dark tribe who took all of his people. The group decide to help him.

They trace the dark tribe on Pegasus, Dragon and Griffin for four days. On the fourth day, they find and fight with them. However their shaman proves to be strong and gives them a strong challenge only to be defeated by Doraemon's gadgets. Unknown to them, the shaman possesses the power to restore. The group take the whole tribe to Japan to give them a peaceful place to live. At night, they return home.

Next day Doraemon tells everybody that the shaman can restore itself and the light tribe is still in danger, so they again go back in time. They arrive too late, as the dark tribe had already taken the light tribe. Again, the group trace the dark tribe with Doraemon's human train gadget, but Nobita gets lost and is separated from the group during a harsh snowstorm.

Except for Nobita, the rest of the group continue to move and they find the light tribe. Doraemon fights with Gigazombie, who is the king of spirits. Doraemon reveals him to be a 23rd century time criminal who aims to create his own world by destroying the time passage, so that no one can find him. He easily defeats Doraemon and the others since he has more updated gadgets than Doraemon.

On the other hand, Nobita finds a box near him and sees a mammoth that tells him that if he needs help he should just press the button. Nobita's pet animals Pegasus, Dragon and Griffin return and they rescue his friend. However Gigazombie shuts them to a lone place. Nobita uses the button and the helper is revealed to be a time patrol who arrests Gigazombie. At the end, Pegasus, Dragon and Griffin are taken to the future as they were fictitious creatures in the current era. The group bids a sad farewell and leaves for their home.

Cast 
An English version produced and released exclusively in Malaysia by Speedy Video, features an unknown voice cast.

Release
The movie was released in Japan on March 11, 1989.

References

External links 
 

1989 films
Nobita and the Birth of Japan
1989 anime films
1989 fantasy films
Animated films set in prehistory
Films directed by Tsutomu Shibayama
Films set in China
Animated films about time travel
Films scored by Shunsuke Kikuchi